is a fighting game developed by SNK, released for arcades in Japan in 1991, and ported to the Neo Geo AES later that same year. The game features playable giant monsters that are reminiscent of characters from kaiju and tokusatsu films.

In 1992, a sequel titled King of the Monsters 2 was released for arcades. Months later, King of the Monsters was ported to the Super Nintendo Entertainment System. It would then be ported to the Sega Genesis in 1993. It was included in the video game SNK Arcade Classics Vol. 1, which was released for the Wii, PlayStation 2 and PSP in 2008.

Gameplay

Players choose one of six monsters (four in the 16-bit ports) for battle, and two players can join forces to fight the monsters together. Battles end when one of the monsters is pinned for a three count or if time expires (in which case the player loses).

The game consists of 12 total levels (8 in the 16-bit ports) which takes place in 6 cities in a futuristic 1996 Japan. Each city is featured twice with the game beginning and ending in Tokyo. Other cities include Kyoto, Okayama, Osaka, Kobe and Hiroshima (the latter two are omitted from the SNES port. The Sega Genesis port only features Tokyo with the other cities being "Mega Port", "Dragon City", and "Castle City"). The player first must defeat all six monsters, with the last monster being oneself, but in a different palette. Then the player must defeat the six monsters again, in the same order, but this time in different cities.

Characters

 Geon: A Godzilla-like dinosaur.
 Woo: A King Kong-like giant gorilla (not available on the ports).
 Poison Ghost: A creature composed of toxic waste (not available on the ports).
 Rocky: A giant Moai-like golem made of boulders.
 Beetle Mania: A large beetle-like creature.
 Astro Guy: A giant Ultraman-like superhero.

Other appearances
In 1992, a sequel called King of the Monsters 2: The Next Thing was released. In 2005, three characters from that sequel (Cyber-Woo, Super Geon and Atomic Guy) were featured in the SNK Playmore game NeoGeo Battle Coliseum, a fighting game featuring many of the company's popular characters. These characters also appeared as character cards in the DS game SNK vs Capcom: Card Fighters DS.

In addition, to the original ports, King of the Monsters was included in SNK Arcade Classics Vol. 1 featuring many rare pieces of the game's production art production art. In 2018, the game was ported to the Nintendo Switch Shop by Hamster as part of their Arcade Archives line. The port features two extra features in a High Score Mode and Caravan Mode. A Neo Geo CD version was advertised and even previewed, but it never released.

Other media

King of the Monsters was a regular on the popular Nickelodeon game show Nick Arcade. It was almost always picked, leaving other games like ActRaiser, Super Ghouls 'n Ghosts, and El Viento out, this was the same on earlier broadcasts of Sky1 show Games World.

Reception

In Japan, Game Machine listed King of the Monsters on their April 1, 1991 issue as being the fourth most-successful table arcade unit of the month. Likewise, RePlay reported King of the Monsters to be the third most-popular arcade game at the time.

Mega criticised the game, awarding it a score of 10%, with Andy Dyer making the comment "unforgivably bad. There should be laws to protect us from crud like this".

IGN reviewed the game in 2008, giving it a mediocre score of 5.5/10, with Lucas Thomas commenting "There's certainly some appeal to the sight of giant creatures kicking over skyscrapers and stadiums on their way to slap one another into submission, but King of the Monsters just ends up being far too shallow".

Notes

References

External links 
 King of the Monsters at GameFAQs
 King of the Monsters at Giant Bomb
 King of the Monsters at Killer List of Videogames
 King of the Monsters at MobyGames

1991 video games
ACA Neo Geo games
Arcade video games
Cancelled Neo Geo CD games
Cooperative video games
D4 Enterprise games
Dinosaurs in video games
Fighting games
Genki (company) games
Kaiju video games
Multiplayer and single-player video games
Neo Geo games
Nintendo Switch games
Now Production games
PlayStation Network games
PlayStation 4 games
Sega Genesis games
SNK franchises
SNK Playmore games
SNK games
Super Nintendo Entertainment System games
Takara video games
Video game franchises
Video game franchises introduced in 1991
Video games set in 1996
Video games with oblique graphics
Virtual Console games
Windows games
Xbox One games
Video games developed in Japan
Hamster Corporation games